Raymond Berthet (27 August 1909 – 8 March 1979) was a French cross-country skier. He competed in the men's 18 kilometre event at the 1932 Winter Olympics.

References

1909 births
1979 deaths
French male cross-country skiers
Olympic cross-country skiers of France
Cross-country skiers at the 1932 Winter Olympics
People from Les Rousses
Sportspeople from Jura (department)
20th-century French people